The  is a compact luxury crossover SUV sold by Lexus, a luxury division of Toyota. Introduced in late 2014, it is positioned between the subcompact UX and the mid-size RX. The NX was proven to be well-received, as it was a sales success. It was the best-selling Lexus model in Europe, and the best-selling luxury car in Russia.

According to Lexus, the name "NX" stands for "Nimble Crossover".



First generation (AZ10; 2014)

Overview 
The first-generation NX was revealed at the Beijing International Automotive Exhibition on 20 April 2014. The NX shares a small portion of parts with the Toyota RAV4 primarily related to the structure and wheelbase, while the styling, suspension parts, some engines, interior, and level of luxury and craftsmanship are unique to the Lexus. The NX variants sold in the United States feature slightly altered fascias, which facilitate higher departure angles, allowing it to be identified by the US EPA as a "light truck". US sales began in November 2014. Production commenced on 8 August 2014 at Toyota Motor Kyushu's Miyata plant.

Powertrains 
The first-generation NX is available in three powertrains; which are designated NX 200t/300, NX 300h, and NX 200.

The NX 200t/300 is powered by a 2.0-liter 8AR-FTS turbocharged four-cylinder direct injection engine that can run on both Otto and Atkinson cycles. This engine has Lexus’ Economy with Superior Thermal Efficient Combustion (ESTEC) direct injection 4-stroke with turbo (D-4ST) fuel injection. With separate twin injectors for both direct and port injection, ESTEC D-4ST could perform high-pressure direct injection into the cylinder and conventional intake port injection, or direct cylinder injection only, according to engine speed.

In addition, the NX 200 with a 2.0-liter 3ZR-FAE naturally-aspirated four-cylinder engine producing  is available in the Russian market.

Gallery 
Pre-facelift

Facelift

Second generation (AZ20; 2021) 

The second-generation NX was revealed on 11 June 2021, which is built on the GA-K platform. Six trims were introduced, consisting of three gasoline trims and three hybrid trims – the NX 200, NX 250 (NX 260 in China), NX 350, NX 350h, NX 400h+, and NX 450h+. Most of the powertrains are shared with the XA50 series Toyota RAV4. The NX 450h+ was also introduced as the first plug-in hybrid vehicle in Lexus' lineup and shares the same powertrain as the RAV4 PHV.

Gallery

Safety 
The 2022 NX was awarded the "Top Safety Pick +" by the Insurance Institute for Highway Safety.

Sales 
In its first full year of sales the NX sold over 43,000 units in the US. It was also successful in Europe where it sold over 28,000 in its first full year of sales, of which more than 17,000 were hybrids. This made it Lexus's best selling model in Europe. Its success was also strong in Russia, where in its first full year of sales it was the best selling luxury vehicle.

References

External links 

 

NX
Cars introduced in 2014
2020s cars
Compact sport utility vehicles
Luxury crossover sport utility vehicles
Front-wheel-drive vehicles
All-wheel-drive vehicles
Hybrid sport utility vehicles
Partial zero-emissions vehicles
Plug-in hybrid vehicles
Vehicles with CVT transmission